The 2004 Valencian Community motorcycle Grand Prix was the last round of the 2004 MotoGP Championship. It took place on the weekend of 29–31 October 2004 at the Circuit de Valencia.

MotoGP classification
Kenny Roberts Jr. was replaced by Gregorio Lavilla after the first practice session due to injury.

250 cc classification

125 cc classification

Championship standings after the race (motoGP)

Below are the standings for the top five riders and constructors after round sixteen has concluded.

Riders' Championship standings

Constructors' Championship standings

 Note: Only the top five positions are included for both sets of standings.

References

Valencian Community motorcycle Grand Prix
Valencian
Valencian Motorcycle Grand Prix
21st century in Valencia